Sir Murray Louis Tyrrell  (1 December 1913 – 13 July 1994) was an Australian public servant, noted as the Official Secretary to the Governor-General of Australia for a record term of 26 years, 1947–73, in which time he served six governors-general.

Early life

Born in Kilmore, Victoria, Tyrrell was the third of five children of Thomas Michael Tyrrell (d. 1928), postmaster, and his wife Florence Evelyn, née Kepert. Tyrrell was educated at Orbost and Mordialloc and Melbourne Boys' High Schools. He married Ellen (Nell) St Clair Greig on 6 May 1939. They had three children, two daughters born first, Leonie Ellen and Margot Evelyn, and then a son, Michael St Clair.

Career
He served for over 45 years in the Australian Public Service. For most of this time he was assistant secretary or personal secretary to a succession of Ministers including the Prime Minister, Ben Chifley.

Tyrrell succeeded Rear Admiral Sir Leighton Bracegirdle as Official Secretary to the Governor-General, William McKell (later Sir William), in March 1947.

Tyrrell also served Sir William McKell's successors Sir William Slim, Lord Dunrossil, Lord De L'Isle, Lord Casey and Sir Paul Hasluck.  The Queen named him a Commander of the Royal Victorian Order (CVO), for his service rendered during the Royal Visit in 1954. He was appointed a Commander of the Order of the British Empire (CBE) in 1959.  Both of these honours occurred during Sir William Slim's term.

Tyrrell had a small but pivotal role to play in the establishment of the Australian Conservation Foundation.  The ACF began in the second half of 1964, after a suggestion was made to Tyrrell by The Duke of Edinburgh while visiting Australia in 1963. He voiced an idea that Australia could become involved in conservation by establishing a branch of the World Wildlife Fund. Tyrrell convened a meeting that came to the conclusion that, if a conservation body was to exist, its efforts should be directed at conserving Australia's own heritage. From this the ACF emerged.

Murray Tyrrell was appointed a Knight Commander of the Royal Victorian Order (KCVO) in 1968, during Lord Casey's term. This was awarded for personal service to the Queen, and was not on recommendation from the Prime Minister. He had been attached to The Royal Household at Buckingham Palace from May to August 1962. After his retirement in 1973, which occurred during Sir Paul Hasluck's term, he was succeeded by David Smith. In 1977, he was named the Australian of the Year, jointly with Dame Raigh Roe.

Sir Murray lived at 11 Blundell Street, Queanbeyan, New South Wales, in an old heritage cottage still called "Sir Murray Tyrrell's Cottage". He was an Alderman of the Queanbeyan City Council 1976–1980.

Tyrrell died on 13 July 1994 in Canberra, at the age of 80.

Honours
 1954 – Commander of the Royal Victorian Order (CVO), in connection with the Royal Visit
 1959 – Commander of the Order of the British Empire (CBE)
 1968 – Knight Commander of the Royal Victorian Order (KCVO)

References

External links
Australian of the Year biography

1913 births
1994 deaths
Australian of the Year Award winners
Australian public servants
Australian Commanders of the Order of the British Empire
Australian Knights Commander of the Royal Victorian Order
People from Kilmore, Victoria